The Stillwater Township School District is a community public school district that serves students in pre-kindergarten through sixth grade from Stillwater Township, in Sussex County, New Jersey, United States.

As of the 2018–19 school year, the district, comprised of one school, had an enrollment of 254 students and 29.3 classroom teachers (on an FTE basis), for a student–teacher ratio of 8.7:1.

The district is classified by the New Jersey Department of Education as being in District Factor Group "FG", the fourth-highest of eight groupings. District Factor Groups organize districts statewide to allow comparison by common socioeconomic characteristics of the local districts. From lowest socioeconomic status to highest, the categories are A, B, CD, DE, FG, GH, I and J.

Students in seventh through twelfth grade for public school attend Kittatinny Regional High School located in Hampton Township, which serves students who reside in Fredon Township, Hampton Township, Sandyston Township and Walpack Township. The high school is located on a  campus in Hampton Township, about seven minutes outside of the county seat of Newton. As of the 2018–19 school year, the high school had an enrollment of 941 students and 97.5 classroom teachers (on an FTE basis), for a student–teacher ratio of 9.7:1. Kittatinny Regional High School was recognized as a National Blue Ribbon School of Excellence in 1997-98.

School
The Stillwater Township School had an enrollment of 262 students in grades PreK-6 as of the 2018–19 school year.
Marissa Cramer, Principal

Administration
Core members of the district's administration are:
William Kochis, Superintendent
René Metzgar, Business Administrator / Board Secretary

Board of education
The district's board of education, comprised of nine members, sets policy and oversees the fiscal and educational operation of the district through its administration. As a Type II school district, the board's trustees are elected directly by voters to serve three-year terms of office on a staggered basis, with three seats up for election each year held (since 2012) as part of the November general election. The board appoints a superintendent to oversee the day-to-day operation of the district.

References

External links
Stillwater Township School
 
School Data for the Stillwater Township School, National Center for Education Statistics
Kittatinny Regional High School

Stillwater Township, New Jersey
New Jersey District Factor Group FG
School districts in Sussex County, New Jersey
Public elementary schools in New Jersey